{{Taxobox
| name = Okenia cochimi
| image = 
| image_width = 
| image_caption = 
| regnum = Animalia
| phylum = Mollusca
| classis = Gastropoda
| unranked_superfamilia = clade Heterobranchia
clade Euthyneura
clade Nudipleura
clade Nudibranchia
clade Euctenidiacea
clade Doridacea
| superfamilia = Onchidoridoidea
| familia = Goniodorididae
| genus = Okenia
| species = O. cochimi
| binomial = Okenia cochimi| binomial_authority = Gosliner & Bertsch, 2004
}}Okenia cochimi is a species of sea slug, specifically a dorid nudibranch, a marine gastropod mollusc in the family Goniodorididae.

Distribution
This species was described from Isla Espíritu Santo, Baja California Sur with an additional specimen from Isla Cedros on the Pacific Ocean coast of Baja California. It has subsequently been reported as far south as the Islas Revillagigedos.

Description
This Okenia'' has a narrow body and five to eight pairs of lateral papillae. The body is translucent yellow with more opaque yellow pigment on the papillae, rhinophores and gills.

Ecology
The diet of this species is probably an encrusting bryozoan.

References

Goniodorididae
Gastropods described in 2004